Tokitsunada Hironori (born Hironori Yoshioka; 2 August 1969 – 14 February 2019) was a sumo wrestler from Waki, Tokushima, Japan. He made his professional debut in March 1985, and reached the top division in May 1992. His highest rank was maegashira 4. He retired in September 1999 and remained in the Sumo Association as jun-toshiyori. He had to leave the Sumo Association in September 2001, having failed to acquire a permanent toshiyori. He was the first jun-toshiyori wrestler to be forced to leave sumo in this way. However he later worked in a private capacity as a coach at Arashio stable. He also ran a chanko restaurant named Tokitsunada in Tokyo. 

He died of heart failure in February 2019 at the age of 49.

Career record

See also
List of sumo tournament second division champions
Glossary of sumo terms
List of past sumo wrestlers

References

External links

1969 births
2019 deaths
Japanese sumo wrestlers
Sumo people from Tokushima Prefecture
Place of death missing